Collier Bay (also Colliers Bay) is a natural bay off the island of Newfoundland in the province of Newfoundland and Labrador, Canada.

References

Bays of Newfoundland and Labrador